The 2018 Limerick county hurling team season was the Limerick senior hurling team's 127th active season of participation in inter-county hurling. During the season, Limerick played in the Munster League, the National League, the Munster Championship and the All-Ireland Championship. It was the team's most successful season in nearly half a century.

Veteran players James Ryan and Gavin O'Mahony retired from inter-county hurling within days of each other at the end of the previous season, while 2017 championship panellist Stephen Cahill was also an absentee. Notable players returning included Kevin Downes, who missed the 2017 season due to a cruciate injury, and David Reidy, who rejoined the Limerick panel after a year with the Kildare senior hurling team. Other additions included several players from Limerick's 2017 All-Ireland Under-21 Championship-winning team, such as Séamus Flanagan.

On 19 August 2018, Limerick won the All-Ireland title for the 8th time in their history after a 3-16 to 2-18 defeat of Galway in the All-Ireland SHC final at Croke Park. Leading by nine points at one stage in the second half and by eight with just two minutes of normal time remaining, Limerick withstood a sensational Galway comeback, which included late goals by Conor Whelan and Joe Canning, to win by a single point. It was their first All-Ireland title since 1973. 

Limerick were described as the "worthiest All-Ireland champions" of all time after playing eight games to win the title, including defeats of the traditional big three - Kilkenny, Cork and Tipperary - as well as the 2017 All-Ireland champions Galway and runners-up Waterford. Over 80,000 fans lined the streets of Limerick to welcome the team home the day after the final.

Players and staff

Backroom staff

All-Ireland Championship

Knockout stages

Statistics

Scorers

Clean sheets

References

Limerick
Hurling in County Limerick
Limerick county hurling team seasons